"Left to Right" is a short story by American science fiction writer Isaac Asimov, featured in the short story collection Gold.

Plot synopsis
Robert L. Forward has created a device that will change whatever goes through it into mirror matter. Another character (who is unnamed) suggests sending protons through it, but Forward says that he has tried that, and will now send himself through. The other character argues that he will not be able to digest because his internal organs will be the wrong way round and his biochemistry altered, but Forward argues that he can just pass through it a second time. He travels through, and checks his heartbeat and appendectomy scar (which are on the same side as before). He gloomily says that everything is the same as before, being "as sure as my name's Robert L. Backward."

External links 
 

Short stories by Isaac Asimov
1987 short stories